Kottarathil Sankunni (born Vasudevan, 1855–1937) was an Indian writer of Malayalam literature. Best known as the author of Aithihyamala, an eight-volume compilation of century-old legends about Kerala, Sankunni's writings cover prose and poetry, including verses for Kathakali and Ottan Thullal. He was one of the founding members of Bhashaposhini Sabha founded by Kandathil Varghese Mappillai and was also involved with Bharata Vilasam Sabha, another literary initiative. He died on July 22, 1937.

Biography 
Kottarathil Sankunni was born on March 23, 1855 at Kodimatha, in Kottayam district of the south Indian state of Kerala (erstwhile Travancore) to Vasudevan Unni-Nangayya couple. The boy, whose name at birth was Vasudevan but was called Thanku, Sanku and later Sankunni, did his early schooling under the tutelage of a local teacher and later, studied Sanskrit under Manarkattu Sanku Warrier and traditional medicine under Vayskara Aryan Narayanan Mooss. He joined Malayala Manorama in 1890 as the editor of their poetry section during which time he tutored a few Britishers the language of Malayalam. In 1893, he was selected as a Malayalam teacher at M. C. High School.

Sankunni married for the first time in 1881 but after the death of his first wife, married Evoor Panaveliveettil Sreedevi Amma in 1887. he married twice more, the brides were Panaveli Lakshmy Amma and Pengali Thekkethu Devaki Amma.
He died on 22 July 1937, at the age of 82.

Legacy 

Sankunni's contributions cover both prose and poetry, including Kathakali literature, Thullal, kilipattu, vanchipattu and other genres of literature. His works include:
 Aithihyamala, a collection of legendary stories including those about Kadamattathu Kathanar, Kayamkulam Kochunni, Parayi petta panthirukulam and others.
 Sreerama pattabhishekam (Kathakali)
 Adhdhyathmaramayanam (Translation)

He was also involved with two literary initiatives, the Bhashaposhini Sabha founded by Kandathil Varghese Mappillai and the Bharata Vilasam Sabha, an organization where most of the literary figures of that period were members.

Aithihyamala 

Sankunni started compiling the legends of Kerala in 1909 and it took over a quarter to a century for him to complete the work. Aithihyamala (Garland of Legends), once completed was an eight-volume compilation of legends and old stories, popular in Kerala over the centuries. The work comprises eight volumes, containing 126 chapters. It was first serialised  in Bhashaposhini literary magazine. Later, it was published by the Reddiar Press in Quilon, in the early twentieth century. Kottarathil Sankunni Memorial Committee entrusted National Book Stall to reprint the work in 1974 and in 1991, D. C. Books published it in a new format. The book is known to have sold over 150,000 copies until 2004.

Bibliography

Selected works

Translations into English

References

External links 
 
 

1855 births
1937 deaths
Writers from Kottayam
Malayali people
Malayalam-language writers
Indian male poets
19th-century Indian poets
20th-century Indian poets
Poets from Kerala
19th-century Indian male writers
20th-century Indian male writers